Nadine Wilson is a Canadian politician. She was first elected to represent the electoral district of Saskatchewan Rivers in the Legislative Assembly of Saskatchewan in the 2007 election, and re-elected in subsequent 2011, 2016, and 2020 provincial elections. She was a member of the Saskatchewan Party until she resigned from the caucus in 2021.

Wilson was twice elected Reeve of the Rural Municipality of Paddockwood and also served as past president for the North Central Rural Municipality Association. She has spent more than a decade involved with 4-H clubs and seven years as a local school trustee. Wilson, who studied social service work, was one of the first women to serve as a corrections worker in the Prince Albert men's correctional facility.

In 2009, Premier Brad Wall appointed her as Legislative Secretary to the Minister responsible for Immigration; New Citizen initiative. After the 2011 provincial election, Wilson was appointed Chair of the Standing Committee on Private Bills, and also served as a member of the Standing Committee on Human Services. In June 2014, she was appointed Provincial Secretary and Legislative Secretary to the Premier.

In 2019 she stepped down from her role as Provincial Secretary, following an assault charge. Wilson subsequently completed an alternative mediation process, resulting in the charge being withdrawn.

Wilson has served as Deputy Speaker of the Legislative Assembly as well as Legislative Secretary to the Ministers of Trade and Export Development and Energy and Resources for Forestry. She also served as Saskatchewan-Ukraine Relations Liaison, Deputy Chair of Committees, and Chair of the Legislature's Standing Committee on Private Bills.

On September 30, 2021, Wilson resigned from the government caucus due to misrepresenting her COVID-19 vaccination status, and then sat as an independent member.

In late 2022, the Saskatchewan United Party was registered with Elections Saskatchewan, with Wilson becoming party leader and its first member in the Legislature.

Cabinet positions

References

External links
 Nadine Wilson MLA Website

Saskatchewan Party MLAs
Women government ministers of Canada
Members of the Executive Council of Saskatchewan
Women MLAs in Saskatchewan
Living people
21st-century Canadian politicians
21st-century Canadian women politicians
Year of birth missing (living people)